The expression red belt is used to designate in the Community of Madrid, since the return to democracy in the last decades of the 20th century, the set of cities located in the southern part of the metropolitan area of the city of Madrid, characterized by their high population of workers or working class and because of their long history with mayors of the Spanish Socialist Workers Party or other left parties and coalitions such as the Communist Party of Spain or the United Left, representing a total of 21% of the population residing in the Community of Madrid, with six out of the ten most populated municipalities of the region belonging to the red belt. The name is also used to talk about the southern districts of the city of Madrid.

As of the 2010s, there was also talk in this country of a "purple belt" in reference to the emergence, with a notable implantation in the red belt, of the new Podemos party, whose color is purple instead of the traditional red of the left-wing parties.

Municipalities of the Madrilenian «red belt»

Notes and references 

Community of Madrid
Politics of Madrid
Belt regions
Left-wing politics in Spain